Dieter Henrich (5 January 1927 – 17 December 2022) was a German philosopher. A contemporary thinker in the tradition of German idealism, Henrich is considered "one of the most respected and frequently cited philosophers in Germany today", whose "extensive and highly innovative studies of German Idealism and his systematic analyses of subjectivity have significantly impacted on advanced German philosophical and theological debates."

Education and career 
Henrich was born in Marburg, on 5 January 1927, the son of Hans Harry Henrich, who worked in survey services, and his wife Frieda née Blum. Because his three siblings died at early ages, he grew up a single child; his father died when he was eleven. Henrich earned his Abitur from the humanistic Gymnasium Philippinum in Marburg in 1946.

Henrich studied philosophy, history and sociology between 1946 and 1950 at Marburg, Frankfurt and Heidelberg. He completed his PhD dissertation at Heidelberg in 1950 under the supervision of Hans-Georg Gadamer. The thesis was Die Einheit der Wissenschaftslehre Max Webers (The unity of Max Weber's epistemology). He wrote his habilitation in 1956, titled Selbstbewusstsein und Sittlichkeit. Henrich was professor at the Humboldt University of Berlin from 1960 to 1965, at the University of Heidelberg from 1965 to 1981, and at the University of Munich from 1981 to 1994, instructing generations of philosophers in standards of interpreting classical texts. He was also a visiting professor at universities in the United States, such as Harvard and Columbia.

Philosophical work 
Dieter Henrich's 1973 lecture course on German Idealism introduced contemporary currents in German philosophy to American audiences. Since then his lectures have been published as Between Kant and Hegel, which show the continuity between German idealism and contemporary philosophical attitudes. Henrich introduced the idea that I-thoughts (what he also called "the epistemic self-relation" [Das wissende Selbstverhältnis]) imply a belief in the existence of a world of objects.

He introduced the term Fichte's original insight (Fichtes ursprüngliche Einsicht) to describe Johann Gottlieb Fichte's idea that the self must already have some prior acquaintance with itself, independent of the act of self-reflection. Henrich noted that Fichte saw the transcendental subject as a primordial selfhood and identified its activity as prior to self-reflection. He also introduced the term Kantian fallacy to describe Immanuel Kant's attempt to ground the self in pure self-reflection, positing the moment of self-reflection as the original source of self-consciousness (see also pre-reflective self-consciousness). His thinking was focused on the mystery of self-consciousness. He pointed out that the evidence of self-consciousness was not really self-evident, but rather obscure, possibly the manifestation of a reason concealed in the clarity of self-consciousness and eluding thought ("die offenkundige Manifestation eines Grundes, der sich in der Klarheit des Selbstbewußtseins gleichsam verbirgt und dem Denken entzieht").

Henrich died on 17 December 2022 at age 95.

Awards 
 1995: Friedrich-Hölderlin-Preis, University of Tübingen
 1999: Honorary doctorate in theology of the University of Münster
 2003: Hegel Prize of the City of Stuttgart
 2002: Honorary doctorate in theology of the University of Marburg
 2004: Internationaler Kant-Preis, ZEIT-Stiftung
 2005: Honorary doctorate in philosophy of the University of Jena
 2006: Deutscher Sprachpreis
 2006: Bavarian Maximilian Order for Science and Art
 2008: Dr. Leopold-Lucas-Preis, University of Tübingen
 2008: Kuno-Fischer-Preis, University of Heidelberg

Major works 

 
 Hegel im Kontext. Frankfurt: Suhrkamp, 1971.  
 Der Grund im Bewußtsein. Untersuchungen zu Hölderlins Denken (1794/95). Stuttgart: Klett-Cotta, 1992.  (2. erw. Aufl. 2004)
 The Unity of Reason: Essays on Kant's Philosophy, Harvard University Press, 1994. 
 Versuch über Kunst und Leben. Subjektivität – Weltverstehen – Kunst. München: Carl Hanser, 2001. 
 Fixpunkte. Abhandlungen und Essays zur Theorie der Kunst. Frankfurt: Suhrkamp, 2003. 
 (with David S. Pacini) Between Kant and Hegel: Lectures on German Idealism. Harvard University Press, 2003. 
 Grundlegung aus dem Ich. Untersuchungen zur Vorgeschichte des Idealismus. Tübingen – Jena 1790–1794. Frankfurt: Suhrkamp, 2004. 
 Die Philosophie im Prozeß der Kultur. Frankfurt: Suhrkamp, 2006. 
 Endlichkeit und Sammlung des Lebens, Mohr Siebeck, 2009 
 Furcht ist nicht in der Liebe. Philosophische Betrachtungen zu einem Satz des Evangelisten Johannes. , Frankfurt, 2022

References

Further reading 
 Dieter Freundlieb, Dieter Henrich and Contemporary Philosophy: The Return to Subjectivity, Ashgate Publishing, Ltd., 2003, p. 137.
 Brad Prager, Aesthetic Vision and German Romanticism, Camden House, 2007, p. 8.
 Paul Redding, Hegel's Hermeneutics, Cornell University Press, 1996, p. 54.
 Jerrold Seigel, The Idea of the Self: Thought and Experience in Western Europe since the Seventeenth Century, Cambridge University Press, 2005, p. 366.

External links 
 Dieter Henrich at University of Munich 

1927 births
2022 deaths
20th-century essayists
20th-century German male writers
20th-century German non-fiction writers
20th-century German philosophers
21st-century essayists
21st-century German male writers
21st-century German non-fiction writers
21st-century German philosophers
Columbia University staff
Continental philosophers
Epistemologists
German male non-fiction writers
Harvard University staff
Academic staff of Heidelberg University
Historians of philosophy
Academic staff of the Humboldt University of Berlin
Idealists
Ontologists
People from Marburg
People from Hesse-Nassau
Philosophers of art
Philosophers of mind
Philosophers of social science
Philosophy academics
Philosophy writers